Zielonka is a Polish surname. There is a Polish noble family under this surname, of the Jastrzębiec coat of arms. Notable people with the surname include:

Shmuel Zielonka, birth name of Sam Zell, Jewish American business magnate
Teresa Ceglecka-Zielonka (born 1957), Polish politician
Manfred Zielonka (born 1960), West German Olympic boxer
Martin Zielonka (1877–1938), German-American rabbi

Polish-language surnames